Melonites is genus of echinoid from Palaechinidae family. Species belonging to this genus lived in late Mississippian (Meramecian). Same generic name was used for genus of a goniatite, which has been later renamed as Nelomites.

References

Devonian echinoderms of North America